Yorkville may refer to:

Locations

Canada
 Yorkville, Toronto, a neighbourhood in Toronto
 Yorkville Village
 Bay station (Toronto), a subway station in Toronto
 Yorkville University, a private University located in New Brunswick

United States
Yorkville, California, Mendocino County
Yorkville, Georgia
Yorkville, Illinois
Yorkville, Indiana
Yorkville, Manhattan, a neighborhood in New York City
Yorkville, Oneida County, New York
Yorkville, Michigan
Yorkville, Ohio
Yorkville (Pottsville, Pennsylvania), a neighborhood
Yorkville, South Carolina
Yorkville, Tennessee
Yorkville, Wisconsin
Yorkville (community), Wisconsin

Other 
Yorkville Sound, a brand of audio equipment

See also